Michael Mmoh was the defending champion but lost in the first round to Bradley Klahn.

Filip Peliwo won the title after defeating Denis Kudla 6–4, 6–2 in the final.

Seeds

Draw

Finals

Top half

Bottom half

References
Main Draw
Qualifying Draw

Knoxville Challenger - Singles
2017 Singles